Poncin Cove is a bay in the U.S. state of Washington.

Poncin Cove was named after Gamma Poncin, an early settler and businessman.

References

Landforms of Thurston County, Washington
Bays of Washington (state)